Ihar Maltsaw (born 11 March 1986) is a Belarusian former professional footballer.

Honours
MTZ-RIPO Minsk
Belarusian Cup winner: 2004–05, 2007–08

Gomel
Belarusian Cup winner: 2010–11

External links

1986 births
Living people
Belarusian footballers
FC Partizan Minsk players
FC Belshina Bobruisk players
FC Gomel players
FC Gorodeya players
FC Slavia Mozyr players
Association football defenders
People from Lida
Sportspeople from Grodno Region